Liverpool Township is one of the seventeen townships of Medina County, Ohio, United States.  The 2020 census found 5,750 people in the township.

Geography
Located in the northern part of the county, it borders the following townships and city:
Columbia Township, Lorain County - north
Strongsville - northeast corner
Brunswick Hills Township - east
Medina Township - southeast corner
York Township - south
Litchfield Township - southwest corner
Grafton Township, Lorain County - west
Eaton Township, Lorain County - northwest corner

No municipalities are located in Liverpool Township, although the unincorporated community of Valley City is located in the center of the township.  The "Frog Jump Capital of Ohio," it lies at the intersection of State Routes 303 (Center Road) and 252 (Columbia Road).

Liverpool Township is located between 20 and 30 miles south of Lake Erie and about five miles west of Interstate 71.

Name and history
This township was named after Liverpool, England. Statewide, the only other Liverpool Township is located in Columbiana County.  According to research and Township residents, Liverpool Township was the first permanent settlement in Medina County. Liverpool Township was established in 1816.

Government
The township is governed by a three-member board of trustees, who are elected in November of odd-numbered years to a four-year term beginning on the following January 1. Two are elected in the year after the presidential election and one is elected in the year before it. There is also an elected township clerk, who serves a four-year term beginning on April 1 of the year after the election, which is held in November of the year before the presidential election. Vacancies in the clerkship or on the board of trustees are filled by the remaining trustees.

References

External links
Township website
County website

Townships in Medina County, Ohio
Populated places established in 1816
1816 establishments in Ohio
Townships in Ohio